Stéphane Jean-Gilles Richer (born April 28, 1966) is a Canadian former professional ice hockey player who is currently serving as sport director at Eisbären Berlin of the Deutsche Eishockey Liga.

Playing career
Richer spent most of his professional career playing in the minors, but did play parts of three seasons in the NHL with the Tampa Bay Lightning (1992–93), Boston Bruins (1992–93), Florida Panthers (1993–94 and 1994–95). He played in 27 NHL games; his NHL totals include one goal, five assists, six points and 20 penalty minutes.

Richer left North America in 1995 to play for Adler Mannheim in Germany. He won the German championship with the Adler squad in 1997, 1998, 1999 and 2001 and remained with the team until the 2001–02 season. Richer spent his final season as a professional hockey player with the Frankfurt Lions before retiring in 2003.

Coaching career
Richer began his coaching career in 2003 as assistant coach of the Frankfurt Lions; he and new head coach Rich Chernomaz led the Lions to a fifth-place regular season finish and a surprise DEL championship in the 2003–04 DEL campaign, defeating the heavily favored Eisbären Berlin in the playoff finals. Richer left the Lions after the season and signed as assistant coach with Adler Mannheim. Midway through the 2004–05 season, he succeeded Helmut de Raaf as head coach. In 2005, Mannheim fired Richer and replaced him with American Greg Poss. Several weeks later, he succeeded Bernhard Engelbrecht as head coach of the Kassel Huskies. Richer guided the Huskies to promotion to the German top-tier Deutsche Eishockey Liga (DEL) in 2008.

On January 6, 2010, he signed a contract as general manager of the Hamburg Freezers, and on March 25, 2010, was named as the club's head coach as well. In December 2010, Richer relinquished the Freezers coaching job to Canadian Benoît Laporte. In 2014, Richer was named DEL Manager of the Year. He signed a contract extension with the Freezers that would keep him with the club until 2019. However, in May 2016, the Freezers folded; Richer, the staff and the players became free agents.

After the Freezers had folded, Richer served as scout for the Los Angeles Kings and worked as director of the youth program at German Oberliga side Crocodiles Hamburg. On January 26, 2017, he was appointed assistant coach to Uwe Krupp for DEL team Eisbären Berlin and promoted to sporting director in May 2017.

Career statistics

Awards and honours

References

External links
 

1966 births
Living people
Adler Mannheim players
Atlanta Knights players
Baltimore Skipjacks players
Boston Bruins players
Canadian ice hockey defencemen
Cincinnati Cyclones (IHL) players
Fredericton Canadiens players
Florida Panthers players
Frankfurt Lions players
Hull Olympiques players
New Haven Nighthawks players
Phoenix Roadrunners (IHL) players
Providence Bruins players
Sherbrooke Canadiens players
Tampa Bay Lightning players
Ice hockey people from Gatineau
Undrafted National Hockey League players
Canadian expatriate ice hockey players in Germany